Thunderhawk is an inverted roller coaster located at Michigan's Adventure amusement park in Muskegon, Michigan, United States. Designed and built by Vekoma, the roller coaster originally debuted in 1998 as Serial Thriller at Geauga Lake in Aurora, Ohio. It was renamed Thunderhawk in 2004 following Cedar Fair's acquisition of the park. After Geauga Lake's permanent closure in 2007, Thunderhawk was dismantled and moved to Michigan's Adventure, where it reopened in 2008.

History

The ride originally opened at Geauga Lake as Serial Thriller on May 9, 1998. It was constructed over what was previously marshland along the shores of Geauga Lake. A small, man-made island was constructed, and to keep it dry, a pump was installed near the ride's entrance. Much of the track and its supports were built over water. The track was originally red and the supports were originally green.

Serial Thriller was kept in operation following the park's ownership changes over the years involving Six Flags and Cedar Fair. In 2004 after Cedar Fair purchased the park, the ride's name was changed to Thunderhawk. The following year(2005), the track was repainted orange while the supports were repainted yellow.

On September 21, 2007, Cedar Fair announced that Geauga Lake & Wildwater Kingdom would no longer operate as a traditional amusement park, instead becoming solely a water park. On October 2, 2007, it was announced that Thunderhawk would be relocated to Michigan's Adventure under the same name.

The ride's structure began to rise in January 2008. During construction of Thunderhawk, the roller coaster was repainted with red track and the supports remained yellow. Its padding and restraints on the trains were replaced as well in accordance with the new color scheme and to improve the ride experience. Michigan's Adventure also made full-length ride DVDs available for purchase by riders. Thunderhawk opened at its current location on May 17, 2008. 

For the 2021 season the supports were repainted dark brown and the track remained red.

Ride experience
After riders board the train, they are pulled up the  lift hill. The train then ascends into a Roll Over, in which the train goes through an Immelmann immediately followed by a Dive Loop. This element inverts riders twice and is shaped like a heart. Next, the train travels through a banked hill and into a Sidewinder, followed by a 270 degree downward helix into a double inline twist that features multiple footchopper effects. The train curves again, dips, and rises up into the final brake run. As the train returns to the station, it curves to the right passing by its maintenance track.

Incidents 

 On May 29, 2017, passengers were trapped on Thunderhawk for 90 minutes after a lift motor malfunction. One train was in the station while the other was on the lift hill. The ride was closed for the remainder of the day.

References

External links

Official page

Geauga Lake
Michigan's Adventure
Roller coasters in Michigan
Roller coasters operated by Cedar Fair
Former roller coasters in Ohio
Amusement rides that closed in 2007